Joseph "Joe" Kuether (born February 2, 1988), known as "The Luckbox", is an American professional poker player. He was ranked 22nd in the 2014 Poker Player of the year rankings, and has lifetime live earnings of over $3,600,000.

Personal life
Kuether grew up in Elm Grove, Wisconsin. 
He attended Brookfield East High School and graduated with a degree in accounting from University of Wisconsin–Madison.

Poker

Online poker
Kuether began playing poker with his friends in high school, moved to online poker, and quickly began taking it more seriously.
Joe learned the intricacies of poker through trial and error, steadily growing a bankroll while playing throughout college. 
Joe has long played under the poker alias, daPHUNNIEman  and has amassed a lifetime total of $976,501 while playing online.

Tournament poker
Kuether is an accomplished tournament and cash game player. After a few years of sparingly playing live, Kuether appeared on the tournament poker scene in 2011, after Poker black friday shut down the online poker world.
Joe has built a name for himself as one of the most consistent players on the poker circuit.

As of 2023, his total live tournament winnings exceed $7,400,000.

Top finishes
Joe's first 7 figure in-the-money finish happened on December 1, 2015, at the PokerStars Caribbean Adventure High Roller event.  He finished 2nd place and took home $1,050,000.

References

1988 births
Living people
People from Elm Grove, Wisconsin
Wisconsin School of Business alumni
American poker players